József Ónody (12 September 1882 – 17 April 1957) was a Hungarian freestyle swimmer who competed in the 1906 Summer Olympics and in the 1908 Summer Olympics.

He was born in Ercsi and died in Budapest.

In 1906 he won a gold medal as a member of Hungarian 4x250 m relay team. He also finished sixth in the 100 metre freestyle competition.

Two years later at the 1908 Olympics he was eliminated in the first round of the 100 metre freestyle event as well as of the 400 metre freestyle competition.

References

External links
profile

1882 births
1957 deaths
People from Ercsi
Hungarian male swimmers
Hungarian male freestyle swimmers
Olympic swimmers of Hungary
Swimmers at the 1906 Intercalated Games
Swimmers at the 1908 Summer Olympics
Medalists at the 1906 Intercalated Games
Sportspeople from Fejér County